Guido Masetti (22 November 1907 – 26 November 1993) was an Italian football goalkeeper and manager.

Club career
Born in Verona, Masetti played for Hellas Verona, and A.S. Roma from 1929 to 1943, appearing in 339 matches, winning an Italian title in the 1941–42 season.

International career
Masetti was considered in the 1930s and 1940s to be one of the strongest goalkeepers, but as a member for the Italy national team he was merely used as a stand-in for Gianpiero Combi and Aldo Olivieri. The team won the World Cups of 1934 and 1938 without playing in any of the matches.

Managerial career
In 1950s, he was manager of A.S. Roma for ten games (5 in season 1950–51, and another 5 in season 1956–57).

Death
He died at age 86 in Rome.

Honours

Player

Club
Roma
Serie A: 1941–42; (runner-up): 1930–31, 1935–36
Coppa Italia (runner-up): 1936–37, 1940–41

International
Italy
FIFA World Cup: 1934, 1938

Individual
A.S. Roma Hall of Fame: 2015

References 

1907 births
1934 FIFA World Cup players
1938 FIFA World Cup players
1993 deaths
Hellas Verona F.C. players
A.S. Roma players
FIFA World Cup-winning players
Association football goalkeepers
Italian footballers
Italy international footballers
Footballers from Verona
Serie A players
Italian football managers
A.S. Roma managers
Palermo F.C. managers
A.S. Gubbio 1910 managers